Edanad  is a village in Alappuzha district in the state of Kerala, India.

References

Villages in Alappuzha district